El Perellonet is a town that is administratively part of the municipality of Valencia, in the Valencian Community, Spain.

Towns in Spain
Populated places in the Province of Valencia
Geography of Valencia